Ranabhat is a surname of people from Nepal.  

Notable Ranabhat includes: 
Eknath Ranabhat, Former member of Parliament of Nepal
Taranath Ranabhat, Former speaker at Nepalese Parliament

References 

Nepali-language surnames